Emily Wachspress (born November 9, 1996), better known by her stage name EM, is an American pop music singer and songwriter from New Jersey. Her songs like Hear Your Love charted at number 20 on the Billboard Adult Contemporary chart.

Life 
Wachspress was born in Vineland, New Jersey and later moved to Voorhees Township where she finished her education at Voorhees Middle School and Eastern High School. Her song Say What You Mean charted number 2 on DRT and 24 on Billboards Adult Contemporary. With the second single, Hear Your Love at number 20 on Billboard Adult Contemporary and 17 on Mediabase.

Discography 

 Hear Your Love
 Say What You Mean
 Dear Life
 You Yourself And I
 Even When It Hurts
 On Time
 Blue Light

References 

1996 births
Living people
American women singer-songwriters
Eastern Regional High School alumni
People from Vineland, New Jersey
People from Voorhees Township, New Jersey
21st-century American women